Christopher Dye FRS, FMedSci (born 15 April 1956) is a British-Irish biologist, epidemiologist and public health specialist. He is Professor of Epidemiology at the University of Oxford and formerly Director of Strategy at the World Health Organization.

Career

Chris Dye trained as a biologist and ecologist (BA University of York) but postgraduate research on mosquitoes (DPhil University of Oxford) led towards epidemiology and public health. Based at Imperial College and the London School of Hygiene and Tropical Medicine from 1982–96, he studied bloodsucking insects as vectors of leishmaniasis, malaria and onchocerciasis in Africa, Asia and South America, and domestic and wild animals as reservoirs of human infection and disease.

Joining the World Health Organization in 1996, he developed ways of analyzing the vast quantities of routine surveillance data (big data) collected by government health departments worldwide ─ extracting signal from noise to devise better methods for understanding and controlling tuberculosis, malaria, and Ebola and Zika viruses. From 2006-09, he was also Gresham Professor of Physic (and other biological sciences), 35th in a lineage of professors that have given public lectures in the City of London since 1597. 
 
As WHO Director of Strategy 2014-18, he served as science advisor to the Director General, oversaw the production and dissemination of health information by WHO press and libraries, and coordinated WHO’s work on health and the Sustainable Development Goals. He is currently Professor of Epidemiology at the University of Oxford, where his research focuses on how choices and decisions are made for public and personal health. He has been Epidemiology Advisor to the Chinese Center for Disease Control and Prevention (as 戴诗磊), Gresham Professor of Physic, a member (trustee) of Council of The Royal Society and the University of York, a Visiting Fellow of All Souls College, Oxford and the Oxford Martin School, and a member of the Board of Reviewing Editors for the journal Science.

Honours and awards

Dye is a Fellow of The Royal Society, the Royal Society of Biology and the UK Academy of Medical Sciences.

Selected publications

 
 World Health Organization (2013). Research for Universal Health Coverage. The World Health Report 2013.
 
 
 Dye, C (2015). The Population Biology of Tuberculosis. Princeton University Press . Chinese edition 结核病种群生物学 published in 2017.
 
 
 
 
 
 Dye, C (2021). The Great Health Dilemma: Is Prevention Better than Cure? Oxford University Press 
 

Further articles are listed by PubMed and Google Scholar. Science discussions and lectures have been broadcast by the BBC, Gresham College, YouTube, the British Academy, The Royal Society, the American Association for the Advancement of Science and the National Academy of Medicine.

References

Scientists from Belfast
World Health Organization officials
British epidemiologists
Fellows of the Academy of Medical Sciences (United Kingdom)
Fellows of the Royal Society
Living people
Alumni of the University of York
1956 births
Professors of Gresham College
British officials of the United Nations